Glen Wilson may refer to:

 Glen P. Wilson (1923–2005), executive director of the National Space Society
 Glen Wilson (footballer) (1929–2005), English footballer
 Glen Wilson (harpsichordist) (born 1952), American classical harpsichordist
 Glen Wilson (squash) (born 1971), squash coach and former squash player from New Zealand
 Glen (Wils) Wilson (musician & designer) (born 1975), Professional Guitarist and International Designer

See also
 Glenn Wilson (disambiguation)